Mr. Back is a South Korean television series based on the web novel Old Man, which was serialized on KakaoPage from April to October 2014. It starred Shin Ha-kyun, Jang Na-ra and Lee Joon. The series aired on MBC from November 5 to December 25, 2014, for 16 episodes.

Synopsis
Choi Go-bong (meaning "highest peak" or "highest salary") is a 70-year-old man who runs a large hotel conglomerate, and he's known nothing but greed and selfishness all his life. When his body suddenly transforms back into his 30s, he becomes gleeful at the chance to relive his youth. He renames himself Choi Shin-hyung (meaning "newest model"), and meets Eun Ha-soo, a part-timer who's just landed her first regular job. Because of Ha-soo, he learns what love is for the first time in his life. At the same time, he develops a relationship with his estranged son and troublesome heir, Choi Dae-han.

Cast

Main
Shin Ha-kyun as Choi Go-bong/Choi Shin-hyung
Jang Na-ra as Eun Ha-soo
Lee Joon as Choi Dae-han
Park Ye-jin as Hong Ji-yoon

Supporting

Jung Suk-won as Jung Yi-gun
Hwang Bo-ra as Yoo Nan-hee
Go Yoon as Kang Ki-chan
Jo Mi-ryung as Choi Mi-hye 
Jeon Gook-hwan as Choi Young-dal 
Hwang Young-hee as Lee In-ja 
Lee Moon-sik as Sung Kyung-bae
Lee Mi-do as Son Woo-young
Lee Mi-young as Go Jung-sook

Ratings

Awards and nominations

International broadcast
 Thailand - Aired on MONO29 every Monday 7:10 pm as from November 2, 2015, titled Kho Yon Wai Hai Huachai Klap Pai Fiao ("ขอย้อนวัยให้หัวใจกลับไปเฟี้ยว", literally: Let Me Reverse My Age, So That My Heart Would Once Again Be Cool).

References

External links
Mr. Back official MBC website 

Mr. Baek at MBC Global Media

2014 South Korean television series debuts
2015 South Korean television series endings
MBC TV television dramas
South Korean fantasy television series
South Korean romantic comedy television series
Television shows based on South Korean novels
Television series by Victory Contents